Daniel P. Serwer is a professor of Practice of Conflict Management as well as director of the Conflict Management and American Foreign Policy programs at the Johns Hopkins School of Advanced International Studies. Serwer is also a research scholar at the Middle East Institute in Washington D.C.

Serwer served as a minister-counselor with the U.S. Department of State. He was deputy chief of mission and chargé d'affaires at US Embassy Rome from 1990 to 1993 and from 1994 to 1996, special envoy and coordinator for Bosnia and Herzegovina. During this posting, Serwer mediated to end the brief Croat–Bosniak War in 1994, and negotiated the first agreement reached at the 1995 Dayton peace talks.

Between 1998 and 2010 Serwer was a vice-president at the United States Institute of Peace, serving for all but one year of his term as vice-president for peace and stability operations at USIP. During that time he led the USIP's peace-building work in Iraq, Afghanistan, Sudan and the Balkans.  At USIP, Serwer specialized in preventing inter-ethnic and sectarian conflict. He was also the Executive Director of the Hamilton/Baker Iraq Study Group.

Serwer is the author of From War to Peace in the Balkans, the Middle East, and Ukraine (Palgrave MacMillan, 2019), Righting the Balance: How You Can Help Protect America (Potomac, 2013) and editor with David Smock of Facilitating Dialogue (USIP, 2012). He regularly blogs on foreign policy at www.peacefare.net.

Personal life 
He is married to art curator Jacquelyn Serwer, with whom he has two sons. His son, Adam Serwer, is a political journalist. Jared Serwer is an architect with Perkins and Will in Atlanta.

References

External links

Johns Hopkins University faculty
Living people
Year of birth missing (living people)